Mahaney is a surname. Notable people with the surname include:

C. J. Mahaney (born 1953), American religious leader
Hilary Mahaney (1902–1969), American football player and coach
Jack Mahaney (1844–?), American criminal
Kevin Mahaney (born 1962) American real estate developer and sailor